The 2011–12 season of 3. Liga was the nineteenth season of the third-tier football league in Slovakia, since its establishment in 1993.

It was divided into two groups: 3. liga západ and 3. liga východ.

The league was also composed of 33 teams divided into two divisions of 16 teams each and 17 teams each. The teams were divided geographically ( Western and Eastern). Teams only played other teams in their own division.

3. liga západ

Team changes from 2010–11
Promoted in 1. liga: ↑Myjava↑
Relegated from 1. liga: ↓Šaľa↓, ↓Púchov↓
Promoted in 2. liga: ↑Dunajská Lužná↑, ↑Sereď↑
Relegated from 2. liga: ↓Rača↓, ↓Bernolákovo↓, ↓Jaslovské Bohunice↓

Locations

League table

3. liga východ

Team changes from 2010–11
Promoted in 1. liga: ↑Podbrezová↑
Relegated from 1. liga: -
Promoted in 2. liga: ↑Kremnička↑, ↑Námestovo↑, ↑Loky Košice↑, ↑FK Bodva B↑
Relegated from 2. liga: ↓Žilina B×↓, ↓Humenné↓

×-withdrew from league

Locations

League table

Promotion play-offs

References

External links
 Slovak FA official site 

3
Slovak
3. Liga (Slovakia) seasons